University Oval, referred to by the University of Adelaide, Adelaide University Sports Association and various other groups, is a part of Park 12 in the Adelaide Parklands located across the River Torrens opposite the University of Adelaide. Park 12 is bounded by North Terrace, Frome Road, Sir Edwin Smith Avenue and King William Road

University Oval
University Oval comprises University Oval No 1 (capacity 100,000) and No 2 and a variety of soccer and general use fields. The up keep of University Oval is provided by the University of Adelaide as a lease arrangement from the Adelaide City Council. The lease is for:
3 x playing fields
6 x synthetic practice cricket pitches
3 x turf practice cricket pitches
3 x tennis courts
 Soccer/ Lacrosse
Softball/ Tennis
 Cricket/ Touch football
 Australian rules football

University oval number one is the home of the Adelaide University Football Club and the Adelaide University Cricket Club.

Torrens River
Other non contiguous areas of Park 12 include the banks of the River Torrens between Frome Road and King William Road and the Torrens Parade Ground. The banks of the Torrens feature a variety of rowing clubs (Prince Alfred College, Adelaide University, Christian Brothers College, Adelaide  High School and Torrens Rowing Club). Commercial interests occupy Jolly's Boathouse Restaurant and the storage sheds for the Popeye pleasure launches.

See also
 Park 10, Adelaide

Notes

References
 Community Land Management Plan (CLMP): Karrawirra (Park 12), Park Lands and Sustainability Business Unit, Adelaide City Council. Adopted by Adelaide City Council on 27 November 2006. (7Mb, 131 pages)

External links
Adelaide University Cricket Club
Adelaide University Football Club
Adelaide University Touch Club
Adelaide University Lacrosse Club
Adelaide University Soccer Club

Parks in Adelaide
University of Adelaide
Sports venues in Adelaide
Cricket grounds in Australia
Australian rules football grounds